Jake Allen (born 11 August 1995) is an Australian speedway rider. He currently rides in the top tier of British Speedway in the SGB Premiership.

Career
He began his British career riding for the Somerset Rebels in 2016, winning the Premier League and Premier League Cup. In 2021, Allen rodes for the Ipswich Witches in the SGB Premiership and the Redcar Bears in the SGB Championship.

In 2022, he signed for Scunthorpe Scorpions again in the SGB Championship 2022 and also had spells at Belle Vue and Sheffield in the Premiership. In 2023, he signed for Leicester Lions for the SGB Premiership 2023 and re-signed for Scunthorpe for the SGB Championship 2023.

References 

1995 births
Living people
Australian speedway riders
Belle Vue Aces riders
Ipswich Witches riders
Leicester Lions riders
Redcar Bears riders
Scunthorpe Scorpions riders
Sheffield Tigers riders
Somerset Rebels riders